Begoña or more puristically but also more rarely spelled Begoina, meaning 'the lower foot' (of Mount Artxanda), is a historical municipality of Biscay (Basque Country, Spain) which was incorporated into Bilbao in 1925.

Originally it included all the uplands south and east of the medieval walled town, which now form the 2nd, 3rd, 4th and parts of the 5th urban districts of Bilbao. Nowadays the name is limited to the district including Santutxu, Bolueta and Begoña proper, a small residential neighbourhood between the Basilica of Begoña and the garden area of Etxebarria Park.

A notable person with this given name is Begoña Gómez Martín, a Spanish Olympic judoka. Due to its association with a church dedicated to Our Lady of Begoña, the name of the neighbourhood is also a popular name of women in the Basque Country and also in some other Spanish-speaking areas.

Sights 

Districts of Bilbao